Richland Township, Ohio may refer to:
Richland Township, Allen County, Ohio
Richland Township, Belmont County, Ohio
Richland Township, Clinton County, Ohio
Richland Township, Darke County, Ohio
Richland Township, Defiance County, Ohio
Richland Township, Fairfield County, Ohio
Richland Township, Guernsey County, Ohio
Richland Township, Holmes County, Ohio
Richland Township, Logan County, Ohio
Richland Township, Marion County, Ohio
Richland Township, Vinton County, Ohio
Richland Township, Wyandot County, Ohio

See also
Richfield Township, Ohio (disambiguation)

Ohio township disambiguation pages